Dimitrios Semsis, also known as Dimitrios Salonikios (1883 – 13 January 1950), was a Greek violinist born Dimitrios Koukoudeas (Δημήτριος Κουκουδέας) in Strumica, in the Salonica Vilayet of the Ottoman Empire (present-day North Macedonia).

At the end of the 19th century, he joined the band of a circus, which was traveling all over the Balkans. In 1908 married his first wife Sonhoula Bochor Hanne and become his daughter Enriquette, cousin of Eskenazi Rosa, in the year about 1910. Later, he joined other traveling bands and played in several places such as Turkey, Syria, Egypt, Sudan and elsewhere.

After the end of the World War I, as Strumica remained in the kingdom of Serbia, Dimitrios Semsis' family moved to Thessaloniki (1919). In 1923, he married Dimitra Kanoula and had four children. At the beginning of 1927 he moved to Athens. By that time he took the nickname "Salonikios", probably because some agents from recording companies thought that his origin was from Thessaloniki.

At the end of the 1920s, Semsis was Recording Director of HMV and Columbia. He participated in hundreds of recordings of folk and smyrnaic songs between 1924 and 1931. He presented his first songs in 1928 and became the Director of Arts of His Master's Voice, in 1931 until his death. He composed over 100 songs.

In the 1930s, Dimitrios was recording with Roza Eskenazi, with great successes. He often was accompanying her to the taverns with Tompoulis, Lampros Savvaidis and Lampros Leonaridis. His compositions were being recorded by the greatest artists of that time, such as Rita Ampatzi, Stelios Perpiniadis and Stratos Pagioumtzis. He composed  folk, smyrnaic and amane songs.

Dimitrios Semsis recorded hundreds of discs and plenty of them are re-released nowadays. In 1972, in an interview, Roza Eskenazi said that Dimitrios was playing "the best violin in the world".

After a short time of illness, he died of cancer in Athens on 13 January 1950.

References

External links
 Dēmētrios Semsēs recordings at the Discography of American Historical Recordings.

1883 births
1950 deaths
Greek folk musicians
20th-century Greek male singers
Greek Macedonians
Greek singer-songwriters
Greek violinists
Rebetiko musicians
People from Strumica
People from Salonica vilayet
Deaths from cancer in Greece
20th-century violinists
Yugoslav emigrants to Greece